Nanhi is a 2013 Pakistani thriller drama serial directed by Haseeb Hassan aired on Geo Entertainment in 2013. Serial is written by Mona Haseeb and produced by Iqbal Ansari. Focuses on the issues of Pakistani society such as child trafficking and education of young girls, it stars Sajal Ali, Shahood Alvi, Asma Abbas and Javaid Sheikh.

Most popular serial of that time of highest TRP of 6.5, lifted Geo TV's perception among local and international audience. It was nominated for all major categories of 13th Lux Style Awards that includes Best TV Play, Best TV Actress, Best TV Writer, Best TV Director and won one award out of four for Best TV Director and it was also nominated for 2 categories for 4th Pakistan Media Awards that includes Best Drama Actress and Best Supporting Actor.

Plot 
Story of Nanhi who is brought up by her Aunt Shammo. Shammo is a professional nurse at a hospital and kidnaps babies from the hospital. Nanhi was also a kidnapped girl by Shammo; Nanhi always thought that Shammo was her mother. Nanhi was always against Shammo for kidnapping and selling babies since she loved babies and wanted one of her own. It is followed by a series of events that she has a baby herself and then the conflict arises.

Nanhi is made to look after kidnapped babies since the age of 4 or 5 years by her so-called mother Shammo. Shammo makes Nanhi look after the babies until the time she is able to sell them off for a good bargain. In this, the nurse and guard at the civil hospital where Shammo works along with local policeman are all in connivance.  Nanhi starts loving children and looks forward to having one of her own. She chides Shammo from time to time for kidnapping babies. Nanhi has a childhood friend called Chanda. Together they play pranks in their locality. Both of them also visit their neighbor, Zaman's house. Zaman's wife has just delivered a baby girl. Zaman despises his wife for being fat and ugly and giving birth to a daughter. Eventually Zaman has an affair with Chanda. In the locality, there is an aged man Alladino, who is a primary school teacher. Also, there is a young man Shahid who loves Nanhi. Nanhi grows to about 15–16 years old (same as Chanda), but is still a child at heart and in behavior.
One day, Shammo brings a stolen baby boy. Nanhi grows very attached to him, but the baby suffocates to death while attempting to hide it during a raid to Shammo's house by the Police. Nanhi is devastated. She brings Zaman's daughter to her house without anyone's knowledge. Zaman and his wife search the whole locality, eventually their girl is found. Zaman is very angry with Nanhi for this and sexually assaults her in her own house when Shammo is not there. Nanhi is oblivious to this rape and is in fact happy that she will have a baby as Zaman had told her so. After a few days when Nanhi does not get a baby, she throws a stone at Zaman. Chanda and Zaman's wife are both angry with Nanhi for doing this. In between there is a huge showdown made by Zaman's wife at Chanda's home for having an affair with her husband. Chanda's widowed mother scolds her, but in vain. Zaman's wife also tells Nanhi not to visit her home as she too may have an affair with her husband. Zaman and Chanda without anyone's knowledge take Nanhi to a vacant house and beat her mercilessly for throwing a stone at Zaman. Zaman also threatens her not to tell anyone about the rape. They are just about to throw her off a balcony when Shahid who was playing cricket in a nearby alley sees them taking Nanhi follows them. He saves Nanhi. Nanhi comes running into her building where an angry Zaman's wife tries to strangle her. Shahid saves Nanhi again. Nanhi is hysterical and runs to Alladino's house. Shahid is unaware of this. Sometime before, Shahid is engaged to Nanhi.
Alladino takes care of Nanhi. Nanhi says she does not want to go home as her mother Shammo hates her, Chanda, Zaman, etc. all are after her life. Alladino quietly takes her to his native house, where Alladino's handicapped and sick 1st wife mistakes Nanhi to be his wife and eventually marries them both. Here, Shahid tells Shammo how Zaman, his wife and Chanda have been cruel to Nanhi. Shammo with the help of a local policeman puts all of them behind bars. In the meanwhile, 2 reporters are digging into the matter of child kidnapping and start suspecting Shammo and are on her trail.
Zaman and Chanda get married when they come out of jail. Zaman's wife becomes a servant in her own house. Nanhi is pregnant with Alladino's child. Alladino brings her back to the city to Shammo's house. Shammo does not know that they are married and tries to marry her to Shahid. Nanhi tells him that she is married and cannot marry him. Shammo is very angry on learning this. Zaman and Chanda also taunt loudly in the locality about Nanhi's character.
In the end, Shammo is arrested for child kidnapping. Nanhi along with Alladino appears on news channel to recount her story. After 6 months Nanhi gives birth to a baby girl and is shown happy with Alladino.

Cast 
 Sajal Ali as Nanhi
 Shahood Alvi as Zaman
 Asma Abbas as Shammo Tai
 Javed Sheikh as Allaudino
 Anoushay Abbasi as Chanda; Nanhi's friend
 Shehroz Sabzwari as Shahid
 Azra Mohyeddin as Tai Ammi
 Shamoon Abbasi
 Rashid Farooqi
 Mishi Khan
 Uroosa Siddiqui
 Mona Alam
 Osama Ghazi
 Shehryar Zaidi

International broadcast  
Nanhi was also aired in India on Zindagi from 14 January 2016 – 2 February 2016 with the same title while in 2020 it was made available on Indian OTT platform Zee5 to stream online across 190 countries.

Awards and nominations

References

External links 
 Official website
 
 Nanhi on ZEE5
 

Geo TV original programming
Pakistani drama television series
Urdu-language television shows
2013 Pakistani television series debuts
Pakistani crime television series
2013 Pakistani television series endings
Television series directed by Haseeb Hassan